2013 EC is a near-Earth asteroid that passed Earth just inside the orbit of the Moon, with its closest approach on March 4, 2013 at 07:35 UTC. 2013 EC was discovered by the Mount Lemmon Observatory in Arizona, United States, on March 2, 2013. Asteroid 2013 EC is estimated to be equal in size to the Chelyabinsk meteor that impacted on February 15, 2013.

2013 EC was one of four asteroids that passed in the vicinity of Earth during one week in early March 2013. The other asteroids in this group besides 2013 EC, included  2013 ET (2.5 lunar distances), 2013 EC20, and 2013 EN20.

See also
List of asteroid close approaches to Earth in 2013
Near-Earth Asteroid Tracking
List of Near-Earth asteroids by distance from Sun
List of asteroid close approaches to Earth
2012 DA14
99942 Apophis
2013 ET
2013 PJ10

References

External links 
 

Minor planet object articles (unnumbered)

20130302